Bag-o Isi Island (variously Magaisi Island or Magaisi Islet) is a small island in northeastern Iloilo, Philippines. It is part of the municipality of Concepcion.

Location and geography 

Bag-o Isi Island is east of Panay Island in the Visayan Sea. Part of the Concepcion Islands, Bag-o Isi is off the north coast of Pan de Azucar Island.

See also 

 List of islands in the Philippines

References

External links
 Magaisi Island at OpenStreetMap

Islands of Iloilo